Pakham is a district (amphoe) in the southwestern part of Buriram province, northeastern Thailand.

Geography
Neighboring districts are (from the north clockwise) Non Suwan, Nang Rong, Lahan Sai, Non Din Daeng of Buriram Province and Soeng Sang of Nakhon Ratchasima province.

History
The minor district (king amphoe) was created on 1 December 1978, when the three tambons Pakham, Thai Charoen, and Nong Bua were split off from Lahan Sai district. It was upgraded to a full district on 15 March 1985.

Motto
The Pakham District's motto is "Golden Buddha image, The inscription millennium, Pakham Mahout and prosperous of civilization."

Administration
The district is divided into five sub-districts (tambons), which are further subdivided into 74 villages (mubans). Pakham is a township (thesaban tambon) which covers parts of tambon Pakham. There are also five tambon administrative organizations (TAO).

References

External links
amphoe.com

Pakham